Polibino is a rural locality (a selo) in Dankovsky District of Lipetsk Oblast, Russia. It serves as the administrative center of Polibinsky Selsoviet, one of the fifteen selsoviets into which the district is administratively divided. Municipally, it is the administrative center of Polibinskoye Rural Settlement.

Nechaev palace
The village was the site of the estate of noble Nechaev family.

The estate is composed of a palace, English park, regular gardens, ponds, and more. The world's first hyperboloid structure by Vladimir Shukhov is located on the grounds of the estate. It was purchased by the then-estate owner Yury Nechaev-Maltsov.

References

Notes

Sources

Rural localities in Lipetsk Oblast